Fabrice Martin and Hugo Nys were the defending champions but chose not to defend their title.

Andrey Golubev and Aleksandr Nedovyesov won the title after defeating Ivan and Matej Sabanov 6–4, 6–2 in the final.

Seeds

Draw

References

External links
 Main draw

Open Quimper Bretagne - Doubles
2020 Doubles